Klimeschiopsis discontinuella is a moth in the family Gelechiidae. It was described by Rebel in 1899. It is found in the southern Alps in Switzerland and northern Italy, as well as the Altai Mountains in Russia.

The wingspan is 13.5–14 mm. The forewings are greyish-black with whitish-grey markings. The hindwings are whitish-grey.

References

Klimeschiopsis
Moths described in 1899